Bruno Leonardo Vicente (born 18 February 1989) is a Brazilian footballer who plays as a midfielder for Casertana F.C. He also holds Italian citizenship.

Club career
Born in Cruzeiro do Sul, Paraná, Vicente started his career at Santa Catarina side Figueirense. He signed a 3-year contract in 2006. In June 2008, he was signed by Campo Grande until December 2009 (de facto associated with agent company Pedrinho VRP), but in August 2008 loaned to Serie B strugglers Treviso, along with Vanderson and Ricardo. Primary a Primavera team player, Vicente made his Serie B debut on 25 April 2009, replacing Federico Piovaccari in the 68th minute. Treviso relegated after the season and he was signed by Lega Pro Prima Divisione side Portogruaro. He became one of the regular starter of the team, started 20 league matches and won the Group B champion. On 13 July 2010, he signed a 1+3-year contract with Serie B side Padova.

In July 2013 Vicente was signed by Parma for an undisclosed fee, with Francesco Modesto moved to opposite direction for a fee of €250,000. Vicente was immediately left for Slovenian club ND Gorica, along with other Parma-contracted players Abel Gigli and Ronaldo Vanin.

After the bankruptcy of Parma, in summer 2015 Vicente was signed by Akragas.

On 26 September 2016 Vicente was signed by Melfi on another free transfer.

On 7 January 2020, he signed a 1.5-year contract with Catania.

On 18 January 2021, he moved to Renate.

He finished his contract with Renate at the end of season. On 16 September 2021 he joined Serie D club Casertana.

Honours
Portogruaro
Lega Pro Prima Divisione (Group B): 2009–10

References

External links
Profile at Football.it 

PrvaLiga profile 

1989 births
Living people
Sportspeople from Paraná (state)
Brazilian footballers
Association football midfielders
Figueirense FC players
Campo Grande Atlético Clube players
Serie B players
Serie C players
Treviso F.B.C. 1993 players
A.S.D. Portogruaro players
Calcio Padova players
Como 1907 players
Parma Calcio 1913 players
S.S. Akragas Città dei Templi players
A.S. Melfi players
S.S. Juve Stabia players
Catania S.S.D. players
A.C. Renate players
Casertana F.C. players
First Professional Football League (Bulgaria) players
FC Botev Vratsa players
Slovenian PrvaLiga players
ND Gorica players
Brazilian expatriate footballers
Expatriate footballers in Italy
Expatriate footballers in Bulgaria
Expatriate footballers in Slovenia
Brazilian expatriate sportspeople in Italy
Brazilian expatriate sportspeople in Bulgaria
Brazilian expatriate sportspeople in Slovenia